Thiemo de Bakker won the final 6–2, 3–6, 6–2 against Martín Alund.

Seeds

Draw

Finals

Top half

Bottom half

References
 Main Draw
 Qualifying Draw

Copa San Juan Gobierno - Singles
2012 Singles
Copa